Actaeus is a Cambrian organism with a resemblance to the great appendage arthropods, containing the single species Actaeus armatus. It is known from a single specimen recovered from the Burgess Shale of British Columbia, Canada.  The specimen is over 6 cm long and has a body consisting of a head shield, 11 body tergites, and a terminal plate.

References

External links
 "Actaeus armatus". Burgess Shale Fossil Gallery. Virtual Museum of Canada. 2011. (Burgess Shale species 23)

Megacheira
Burgess Shale animals
Cambrian arthropods
Fossil taxa described in 1970
Cambrian genus extinctions